Podpolkovnik is a military rank in Slavic and nearby countries which corresponds to the lieutenant colonel in the English-speaking states and military.

In different languages the exact name of this rank maintains a variety of spellings. The transliteration is also in common usage for the sake of tradition dating back to the Old Slavonic word "polk" (literally: regiment sized unit), and include the following names in alphabetical order:

 Bosnia and Herzegovina and Croatia — 
 Bosnia and Herzegovina, Montenegro and Serbia — 
 Bulgaria — 
 Czech Republic — 
 Georgia — 
 North Macedonia — 
 Poland — 
 Russia —  (podpolkovnik)
 Slovenia — 
 Slovakia — 
 Ukraine —  (pidpolkovnyk)

Russia 

In Russia, the rank of lieutenant colonel is called . First it appeared in Russia as appointment or assignment to the assistant or deputy commander of a regiment sized military formation at the end of the 15th — early 16th century.

Normally it was of nobility or boyar origin.

From the 17th - to early 17th century there was a rank and an appointment under the designation . Beyond its normal responsibilities, he was in charge to command the second half of the regiment, the rear -, reserve -, and other regular units (until the introduction of the battalion structure).

Russian Empire
From the introduction of the Russian table of ranks to the abolishment in 1917  was quoted to rank positioned VII, and until 1856 it was privileged by hereditary nobility.

From this moment, the rank  was equivalent to the rank armed forces' . In line to this reform, the shoulder board rank insignia had been changed from two big stars to three smaller ones.

To the formations of the so-called leyb-guard, the rank  had not been introduced.

The rank  was abolished 16 December 1917, together with all previous ranks and rank insignia of the former Russian imperial army.

In the white voluntary army the rank was in the period from December 1917 to November 1918. Than it was abolished as well, and harmonized to the Kapitan ranks of the guard and other officers of the other formations. However, in the Russian army of general Pyotr Nikolayevich Wrangel the podpolkovnik rank was reestablished in April 1920.

USSR 

By foundation of the Soviet Union the rank designation and rank insignia of the Imperial Russian Army were suppressed. An equivalent rank to podpolkovnik was created in 1924, by the introduction of the so-called status category 8 rank –. However, this was overtaken by the introduction of individual ranks in 1935.

Podpolkovnik as a military rank was reintroduced September 1, 1939 by disposal of the Central Executive Committee of the Soviet Union (from September 2, 1939), and the Council of People's Commissars of the USSR No. 2690 (article 41, pertaining the law of universal compulsory military service), published by the order No. 226 of the People's Commissar of Defence (from July 26, 1940).

The Red Army used this rank together with a number of other former Russian ranks, and it has been used in many ex-USSR countries, including Russia, to the present day.

By the first promotion to that particular rank the hitherto (old) polkovnik collar distinction insignia with three parallel bars had to be used. The new polkovnik rank was from now on characterized by four bars. This insignia had to be worn until the introduction of shoulder boards, and were finally replaced in 1943.

In the Soviet navy the rank kapitan 2nd rank was equivalent to podpolkovnik. In the civil administration it was corresponding to privy councillor. The rank podpolkovnik was abolished 16 December 1917, together with all previous ranks and rank insignia of the former Russian imperial army. In the military political organization it was equivalent to starshy battalion commissar, another corresponding rank designation was Specialist 1st rank (pertaining to: military engineers, surgeons, commissionaires, veterinary surgeons, and legal personnel).

 1943—1992
In late 1943 shoulder boards were reintroduced as rank designation. From this moment in the podpolkovnik rank of the Red Army was specified by two big horizontal stars, on shoulder boards, with parallel piping (two straps). The stars had to be established on a distance of 35 mm from the lower end of the shoulder board (Rules to wear military uniforms in the Soviet Army and the Navy). From 7 November 1944 the stars were pinned direct (symmetrically to the piping) on piping.

Russian Federation 
If military personnel serves in a guards formation, or on a guards war ship, to the rank designation will be placed in front the noun guards (e.g. "Gurds podpolkovnik"). Civil – or military personnel with a specific defined level of expertise or knowledge in medical or judicial professions, to the military rank will be added the noun "legal or the wording "medical service". Further adding to the military rank designation might be "retired" or "on retirement".

Personnel serving in the executive of the Russian Federation might be specified by rank designation as follows.

Podpolkovnik of the Police (until March 1, 2011 Podpolkovnik of the Militsiya)
Podpolkovnik of the Internal Troops
Podpolkovnik Investigation of Tax Offence

Lieutenant colonel's insignia

See also 
 Lieutenant (Eastern Europe)
 Colonel (Eastern Europe)
 Lieutenant colonel general
 Comparative army officer ranks of Europe

References 

Military ranks
Military ranks of Poland
Military ranks of Russia
Military ranks of Ukraine
Military ranks of the Soviet Union